is a public university in Komagane, Nagano, Japan. The school was established in 1995.

External links
 Official website 

Educational institutions established in 1995
Public universities in Japan
Universities and colleges in Nagano Prefecture
Komagane, Nagano
1995 establishments in Japan
Nursing schools in Japan